The Convention of Southern Baptist Churches in Puerto Rico (Spanish: Convención de Iglesias Bautistas del Sur de Puerto Rico) (CSBPR) is a group of churches affiliated with the Southern Baptist Convention located in the U.S. territory of Puerto Rico.

History
The convention has its origins in a mission of the North American Mission Board in 1964. It was officially founded in 1965 as Association of Southern Baptist Churches. In 2001 it became a convention and a member of the Southern Baptist Convention in 2004.

See also
Southern Baptist Convention
List of state and other conventions associated with the Southern Baptist Convention

References

External links 
 Convention of Southern Baptist of Puerto Rico
 
Christianity in Puerto Rico

Christianity in the United States Virgin Islands
Evangelical denominations in North America